Mass for You at Home is a religious television program broadcast by Network 10. It is the longest-running Australian religious television program; it is also Australia's fourth-longest-running television programme overall, and the longest-running show broadcast on Australian commercial television.

The program is intended to allow observant Catholics, particularly those with mobility problems, to participate in a mass from their homes. Mass for You at Home is broadcast on Network 10 on Sundays and Aurora Channel on Foxtel every day. The programme typically has thousands of viewers around Australia.

Production

The programme has been broadcast by Network 10 since August 1971. It was initially a joint venture between the Catholic Archdiocese of Melbourne and the network, which also offers airtime for the show.

Before 2021 the show was filmed entirely at 10's Como studios in Melbourne, with a year's worth of episodes typically filmed in January for broadcast throughout the year. In December 2020 it was announced that the show would undergo some production changes, including a "new look" and the filming of masses in churches. In 2021 the filming of the show moved to Wollongong, and is now produced by the Catholic Diocese of Wollongong in partnership with the Australian Catholic Bishops Conference.

Geoffrey Baron was a celebrant on this program for 30 years. In 2006 he received national attention as a result of an altercation with teenagers that was recorded and subsequently uploaded to YouTube.

Cardinal Pell frequently watched the program during his imprisonment in 2019-20 and expressed appreciation for its quality.

See also

 List of longest-running Australian television series

References

External links
 Official website 
 Mass For You at Home at 10 Play website

Network 10 original programming
10 Peach original programming
1971 Australian television series debuts
1980s Australian television series
1990s Australian television series
2000s Australian television series
2010s Australian television series
Television shows about Catholicism
Black-and-white Australian television shows